Bryan Silva Teixeira Jr. (born 1 September 2000) is a professional footballer who plays as a winger for Austrian club Sturm Graz. Born in France, he plays for the Cape Verde national team.

Career
On 17 July 2019, Teixeira signed his first professional contract with Clermont Foot. He made his professional debut with Clermont in a 1–0 Ligue 2 win over on 2 November 2019.

He spent the second half of the 2019–20 season on loan at US Concarneau. He made five appearances in Championnat National before the season was abandoned due to the COVID-19 pandemic.

In June 2020, he joined US Orléans, newly relegated to Championnat National, on a season-long loan.

On 31 August 2021, he joined Austrian club Austria Lustenau on loan for the 2021–22 season. On 30 June 2022, Teixeira returned to Austria Lustenau on a permanent basis and signed a contract until the summer of 2024.

On 7 January 2023, Teixeira joined SK Sturm Graz on a contract until 2026.

International career
Born in France, Teixeira is of Cape Verdean descent. He debuted with the Cape Verde national team in a friendly 1–0 loss to Ecuador on 11 June 2022, coming on as a substitute.

Honours
Austria Lustenau
 Austrian Football Second League: 2021–22

References

External links
 
 
 

2000 births
Living people
Footballers from Seine-et-Marne
Cape Verdean footballers
Cape Verde international footballers
French footballers
French sportspeople of Cape Verdean descent
Association football wingers
FC Fleury 91 players
Clermont Foot players
US Concarneau players
US Orléans players
SC Austria Lustenau players
SK Sturm Graz players
Ligue 2 players
Championnat National players
Championnat National 3 players
2. Liga (Austria) players
Austrian Football Bundesliga players
Cape Verdean expatriate footballers
French expatriate footballers
Expatriate footballers in Austria
French expatriate sportspeople in Austria